Alvin Lee and Company is an album of material previously unavailable on LP released by their old record label Deram after they had switched to Chrysalis Records in the UK and Columbia Records in the US. It consists of 2 non album singles, "Rock Your Mama" and "Portable People", the latter's b side "The Sounds", a live track, "Crossroads" and two outtakes, "Hold Me Tight" and "Boogie On".

Track listing
All songs written by Alvin Lee, unless otherwise noted.
"The Sounds" – 4:13
"Rock Your Mama" – 2:55
"Hold Me Tight" – 2:15
"Standing at the Crossroads" (Elmore James, Robert Johnson) – 4:00
"Portable People" – 2:13
"Boogie On" – 14:25

CD reissue bonus tracks
"Spider in My Web" – 7:19 
"Hear Me Calling" – 3:48 (Single version)
"I'm Going Home" – 3:37 (Single Version) 

 NOTE: Some track times are incorrectly listed on the record sleeve: the Sounds (4:00), Rock Your Mama (3:00) and Boogie On (14:25).

Personnel
Ten Years After
Alvin Lee – guitar, vocals
Chick Churchill – organ
Ric Lee – drums
Leo Lyons – bass

References

1972 compilation albums
Ten Years After albums
Deram Records compilation albums
Albums produced by Mike Vernon (record producer)